Edese Zwem- & Poloclub Polar Bears or simply Polar Bears Ede  is a swimming and water polo club based in the city of Ede, Netherlands.

History 
The club was founded in 1946 and the name (Polar Bears) is a tribute to the Polar Bear Division (49th (West Riding) Infantry Division), a British military unit composed not only by British but also by Polish and Canadian troops, freed the city of Ede by Nazi Germany in 1945.

Titles & achievements 
Dutch League
 Winners (8): 1989-90, 1990–91, 1991–92, 1994–95, 1995–96, 2004–05, 2005–06, 2006-07
Dutch Cup (KZNB)
 Winners (5): 1991-92, 1993–94, 2005–06, 2012-13, 2015-16
Dutch Cup (KZNB) 2
 Winners (1): 2009-10

European competitions 
LEN Champions League
 Semifinalist (2): 1991-92, 1992–93

External links 
 Official website

Water polo clubs in the Netherlands
Sports clubs in Ede, Netherlands
1946 establishments in the Netherlands
Sports clubs established in 1946